Johan Voltmar (c. 1685 – ?) was a German musician and composer, who lived in Copenhagen, Denmark from c. 1711, together with his family. Voltmar was married to Anne Margretlie Elisabeth Voltmar, who also possessed artistic talent. Together, they had at least 3 daughters and 4 sons, who also were accomplished artists.

Voltmar was presumably an oboist in the Grenadier regiment, but later became a royal violinist at the Royal Danish Orchestra. The parents homeschooled their children, and the two eldest sons, Herman Friedrich Voltmar and Johan Foltmar both became professional musicians. The two youngest, Christian Ulrik Foltmar and Christoffer Foltmar were artists.

Johan Voltmar's compositions include a flute sonata and a concert for four flutes, 2 violins and double bass.

See also
List of Danish composers

References
This article was initially translated from the Danish Wikipedia.
(Danish) article in DMT by Erling Winkel 1942
 Source

Year of death missing
Danish Baroque composers
Danish classical composers
Danish male classical composers
Foltmar family
1680s births
18th-century Danish composers
18th-century male musicians
17th-century Danish composers
17th-century male musicians